George William Wakefield (13 November 1887, Hoxton-12 May 1942, Norwich Hospital) was a British comics artist and illustrator. He is best remembered for his Laurel and Hardy comics published by Amalgamated Press' Film Fun from 1930 to his death.

Bibliography 
 
 George William Wakefield on Lambiek.

1887 births
1942 deaths
British illustrators